Lactarius subvelutinus is a member of the large milk-cap genus Lactarius in the order Russulales. It was first described scientifically by American mycologist Peck in 1904.

See also
List of Lactarius species

References

External links

subvelutinus
Fungi described in 1904
Fungi of North America
Taxa named by Charles Horton Peck